Vice-Admiral Sir John Tremayne Rodd, KCB (c. 1769 – 4 October 1838) was an officer of the Royal Navy noted for his services during the Napoleonic Wars. Rodd served in a number of ships, including  under Admiral Sir Charles Cotton and  during the Battle of the Basque Roads. In 1809, he married the daughter of James Rennell and in 1825 was promoted to rear-admiral, later advancing to vice-admiral and knighted. He died in 1838.

Life
In the former he participated in the capture of the French privateer Le Poisson Volant in the West Indies on 4 August 1796, and in the latter he captured the Dutch privateer Courier, for which was promoted to post captain on 7 September 1798. After the Peace of Amiens in 1803, Rodd briefly took command of the first rate ship of the line  under Admiral Sir Charles Cotton, but by 1805 had moved to the veteran frigate . In Indefatigable, Rodd served as the main scout for the British squadron blockading Brest, France. In 1805 he sighted the French fleet under Admiral Ganteaume attempting to escape and warned the Offshore Squadron, who drove the French back into Brest in a brief engagement.

In early 1809, Rodd gained information concerning the departure of the French frigate Niémen from Brest, which led to her capture in early April. The same month, Indefatigable was heavily engaged at the Battle of Basque Roads, in which the French fleet in Brest was driven onto shoals by fireships launched by Cochrane who then attacked. Cochrane was inadequately supported by Admiral Lord Gambier and as a result only five French ships were destroyed instead of the entire fleet. Throughout the battle Rodd was heavily engaged with superior enemy forces, closely supporting Cochrane's attack. In the summer of 1809 he was called as a witness at the Court-martial of James, Lord Gambier which assessed whether Gambier had failed to support Cochrane at the battle. Gambier was controversially cleared of all charges. He left Indefatigable soon afterwards. In 1809, Rodd married Jane Rennell, daughter of Major James Rennell, a noted geographer who often assisted her father in his work. In 1814, Rodd moved to the ship of the line  but was placed in reserve at the end of the war in the same year.

In 1825, Rodd was promoted to be a Rear-Admiral of the Red, and on 20 February 1832 he was knighted as a Knight Commander of the Order of the Bath. He died at Tunbridge Wells in October 1838, survived by his wife and recently promoted to vice-admiral.

Notes

References

 

1769 births
1838 deaths
Royal Navy vice admirals
Royal Navy personnel of the French Revolutionary Wars
Royal Navy personnel of the Napoleonic Wars
Knights Commander of the Order of the Bath